Kołodziejski (feminine: Kołodziejska; plural: Kołodziejscy) is a Polish-language occupational surname derived from the occupation of kołodziej ("wheelwright"). Notable people with this surname include:

 Chris Kolodziejski (born 1961), American football player
 Cindy Kolodziejski (born 1962), German-born ceramic artist
  (1884–1953), Polish historian and statesman
 Katarzyna Kołodziejska (born 1985), Polish handball player
 Leslie Kolodziejski (born 1958), American professor of electronics engineering
 Michał Kołodziejski (born 1975), Polish diplomat
  (born 1966), Polish journalist and statesman

See also
 
 Kołodziej

Polish-language surnames
Occupational surnames